Olga Bede (November 24, 1908 in Dicsőszentmárton – 1985 in Târgu Mureş) was a Romanian Magyar writer.

She finished her studies in Dicsőszentmárton in 1925 and worked as a bureaucrat in several towns of Transylvania.

Works
Harkály doktor, 1957
Az Óperencián innen és túl, 1957
Aranymadár, 1958
Varázstükör, 1958
Két kis csibész kalandjai, 1960
Pionírok az űrhajón, 1961
Kék virág, 1961
Mai játék, 1963
Pionír-köszöntő, 1964
Mesél az erdő, 1964
Be szép a nyár, 1968
Bújj, bújj zöld ág, 1968

Sources
  http://mek.oszk.hu/03600/0362

1908 births
1985 deaths
Romanian writers
Romanian people of Hungarian descent
People from Târnăveni